2012 ACC tournament may refer to:

 2012 ACC men's basketball tournament
 2012 ACC women's basketball tournament
 2012 ACC men's soccer tournament
 2012 ACC women's soccer tournament
 2012 Atlantic Coast Conference baseball tournament
 2012 Atlantic Coast Conference softball tournament